Brigadier John de la Hay Gordon (30 March 1887 – 22 December 1959) was a British army officer, administrator and diplomat who served as Resident to the Mysore Kingdom from 1937 to 1942 and Chief Commissioner of Coorg Province from 1937 to 1940.

Early life and education 

Gordon was born on 30 March 1887 to  Alexander Hamilton Miller Haven Gordon and Ada Austen Eyre. He was educated at Rossall School at Fleetwood in Lancashire, United Kingdom and the Royal Military College at Sandhurst. Gordon joined the army in 1906 and was commissioned into the Royal Irish Regiment.

Army 

Gordon was transferred to the Indian Army in 1908 and was appointed political officer of the Government of India in 1911. Gordon fought in the First World War and was mentioned in despatches twice. In 1936, Gordon was appointed military Governor-General of the Western Indian States Agency. On his retirement from the army in 1937, Gordon was appointed resident to the Mysore kingdom. While resident, Gordon also held office as the Chief Commissioner of the neighbouring Coorg Province.

On 1 July 1940, Coorg was separated from Mysore and a new Chief Commissioner was appointed to administer the province. The first Chief Commissioner to hold independent charge was J. W. Pritchard. Gordon remained Resident of Mysore till the end of his term in 1942.

Honours 

Gordon was awarded the Military Cross in 1916. He was made an officer of the Order of the British Empire in 1918, Companion of the Order of the Indian Empire in 1937 and Companion of the Order of the Star of India in 1941.

Family life
Gordon married Esme Violet Bevan on 5 October 1920 in Aden. He died on 22 December 1959 at Mabane, Swaziland aged 71.

References 

 

1887 births
1959 deaths
Officers of the Order of the British Empire
Companions of the Order of the Indian Empire
Companions of the Order of the Star of India
Commissioners and Chief Commissioners of Coorg
British people in colonial India